Eric Prabhakar (23 February 1925 – 10 September 2011) was an Indian sprinter. He competed in the men's 100 metres event at the 1948 Summer Olympics, reaching the quarterfinals. He was also a Rhodes Scholar and he subsequently worked for Burmah-Shell Oil and UNESCO as well as being an active sports administrator in  India.

Personal life 
Eric was born on February 23, 1925, in a family noted for its achievements in sports and in the sphere of education. His brother, E. C. P. Prabhakar, has represented the state in cricket, hockey and tennis and was a top rated bureaucrat.

Eric was married to Saro Prabhakar with who he has three sons, Dev, Sathi, and Jay.

Career 
After graduating in economics, Eric got an opportunity to enter enter the Indian Administrative Service (IAS).

Competition record

References

External links
 

1925 births
2011 deaths
Indian male sprinters
Athletes (track and field) at the 1948 Summer Olympics
Olympic athletes of India
Athletes from Tamil Nadu
Sportspeople from Chennai
Indian Rhodes Scholars
Alumni of Christ Church, Oxford
University of Madras alumni